Andrius Jurkūnas (born 21 May 1976) is a Lithuanian professional basketball coach and former player.

Playing career
Jurkūnas played for Clemson University, which he attended from 1995 to 2000.

He then moved to Žalgiris Kaunas, where he played 1.5 seasons. In 2002, he moved to Polonia Warsaw. After the 2001–2002 season, he signed the contract with Alba Berlin; however, he was released immediately after the health examination. Then he played for Hapoel Jerusalem, Astoria Bydgoszcz and Ironi Ashkelon. In 2004, he signed with Dornbirn Lions. From 2005 to 2009, he played for Szolnoki Olaj. Jurkūnas finished his career by playing for Savanoris Alytus and TiuMenas-Ežerūnas Molėtai.

Coaching career
After finishing his playing career, Jurkūnas joined Szolnoki Olaj coaching staff.

Honours

Clubs
 Lithuanian champion – 2001
 Hungarian champion – 2007

International
 FIBA Europe Under-18 Championship gold medal – 1994
 FIBA Europe Under-20 Championship golde medal – 1996
 Summer Olympics bronze medal – 1996

Career statistics

Euroleague

|-
| style="text-align:left;"| 2000–01
| style="text-align:left;"| Žalgiris
| 12 || 9 || 26.2 || .556 || .414 || .657 || 3.7 || 1.1 || 1.3 || .9 || 12.1 || 10.4
|-
| style="text-align:left;"| 2001–02
| style="text-align:left;"| Žalgiris
| 5 || 0 || 21.4 || .1000 || .571 || .250 || 1.8 || .8 || .4 || .6 || 6.6 || 3.6

Lithuanian national team
Jurkūnas was a member of the Lithuanian national team which won bronze medals at the 1996 Olympic Games.

References

1976 births
Living people
Basketball players at the 1996 Summer Olympics
Astoria Bydgoszcz players
BC Žalgiris players
Clemson Tigers men's basketball players
Hapoel Jerusalem B.C. players
Lithuanian men's basketball players
Lithuanian expatriate basketball people in the United States
Medalists at the 1996 Summer Olympics
Olympic basketball players of Lithuania
Olympic bronze medalists for Lithuania
Olympic medalists in basketball
Basketball players from Kaunas
Szolnoki Olaj KK players
Power forwards (basketball)